The river regime generally describes the character of the typical fluctuations of flow of a river, but can also refer to the mathematical relationship between the river discharge and its width, depth and slope. Thus, "river regime" can describe one of two characteristics of a reach of an alluvial river:
 The variability in its discharge throughout the course of a year in response to precipitation, temperature, evapotranspiration and drainage basin characteristics (Beckinsale, 1969)
 A series of characteristic power-law relationships between discharge and width, depth and slope

The latter is described by the fact that the discharge through a river of an approximate rectangular cross-section must, through conservation of mass, equal

Because of this relationship, as discharge increases, depth, width, and/or mean velocity must increase as well.

Empirically-derived relationships between depth, slope, and velocity are:

 refers to a "dominant discharge" or "channel-forming discharge", which is typically the 1–2 year flood, though there is a large amount of scatter around this mean. This is the event that causes significant erosion and deposition and determines the channel morphology.

The variability in discharge over the course of a year is commonly represented by a hydrograph with mean monthly discharge variations plotted over the annual time scale. When interpreting such records of discharge, it is important to factor in the time scale over which the average monthly values were calculated. It is particularly difficult to establish a typical annual river regime for rivers with high interannual variability in monthly discharge and/or significant changes in the catchment's characteristics (e.g. tectonic influences or the introduction of water management practices).

Classification
There are three basic types of regimes (Pardé, 1955):
simple regime - one maximum and one minimum per year
mixed regime/double regime - two maximums and two minimums per year
complex mode - several extrema

Simple regimes
Simple regimes can be nival, pluvial or glacial, depending on the origin of the water.
Simple regime is where all rivers have one peak discharge per year
Glacial regime

The glacial regime is characterised by:
Very high discharge in summer after the ice melt
Very low discharge from the end of autumn to early spring
Amplitude of monthly variation of discharge greater than 25
Very high daily variability in discharge during the year
High flow (several hundred l/s/km2)

It is found at high altitudes, above . Example: Rhône at Brigue.

Nival
The nival regime is similar to the glacial, but attenuated and the maximum takes place earlier, in June. It can be mountain or plain nival. The characteristics of the plain nival (example: Simme at Oberwi) are:
Short and violent flood in April–May following massive spring thawing of winter snows
Great daily variability
Very great variability over the course of the year
Great inter-annual variability
Significant flow

Pluvial

The pluvial regime is characterized by:
high water in winter and spring
low discharge in summer
great inter-annual variability
flow is generally rather weak

It is typical of rivers at low to moderate altitude. Example: Seine.

Tropical pluvial
The tropical pluvial regime is characterized by:
very low discharge in the cold season and abundant rainfall in the warm season
minimum can reach very low values
great variability of discharge during the year
Relatively regular from one year to another

Mixed régimes/double regime

Nivo-glacial
only one true maximum, which occurs in the late spring or the early summer (from May to July in the case of the Northern hemisphere)
relatively high diurnal variations during the hot season
significant yearly variation, but less than in the snow regime
significant flow

Nivo-pluvial
two maximums, the first occurring in the spring and the other in autumn
a main low-water in October and a secondary low-water in January
significant inter-annual variations

Example: 
Pluvio-nival
a period of rainfall in late autumn, followed by a light increase due to snow melt in early spring
the single minimum occurs in autumn
low amplitude

Example: Mississippi.

Complex regimes
The complex regime is characteristic of large rivers, the flow of which is diversely influenced by numerous tributaries from different altitudes, climates etc. The influences diminish extreme discharges and increase the regularity of the mean monthly discharge from upstream to downstream.

References

Rivers
Hydrology